Medpalli Nakkerta is a village in telangana, India.

History 
The village was formed with the combination of two villages named Nakkartha and Medipally.

Geography 
Nakkartha Medipally lies on the 17.003° north latitude and 78.654° east longitude. It is about 530 meters above sea level. It is one of the backward villages of Ranga Reddy district. It is located in the Yacharam mandal of Ranga Reddy district in Telangana, India. It is near to the well known Nagarjuna Sagar Highway, about 7 km away. It is surrounded by mountains on three sides.

Religious places 
There are people of three religions in the village. There are sacred places for Hindus, Muslims and Christians.

Hindu 
The village has a huge Hindu temple complex with temples for Rama, Shiva, and Hanuman. There are also many temples for Beerappa, Maisamma, Pochamma, Mahankali, Mallanna on the borders of the village. There is a famous temple for Narsimhaswami on a hill called Narsimha Gutta. It receives worshipers every year. There is a temple for Lord Hanuman who receives worships mostly on Saturdays.

Muslim 
There is a big mosque in the village. Prayers are done by the Muslims three times a day.

Christian 
There is a Church for Christians where prayer goes on daily.

Unity among religions 
Even though there are different places of worship for different religions, people of all religions often worship for all gods. All gods are considered to be equal and are worshiped by all religions. Hindus often go to a Mosque and pray for Allah, and they often go to church and pray for Jesus. In the same way Muslims and Christians pray for Hindu Gods. This shows unity in diversity in the village.

Transport 
The village has good transport facilities. It has regular buses for every hour to the nearest town, Ibrahimpatnam. It has buses to move to the town called Mall. The Secunderabad railway station is just 50 km away. It has a good auto service in case of emergency and in case the bus is off schedule.

Politics 
The village sarpanch is Pache Basha (elected in 2014). The village MPTC is Mote Srisailam.

Grampanchayat 
The village is run by the village Gram Panchayat. It consists of VRO, sarpanch, MPTC, 12 ward-members, political leaders, etc.

Schools 
The village has a Zilla Parishad High School, two Mandal Parishad Primary Schools and Pudami The English Primaries school.

ZPHS 
The school is located at the village entrance beside the Indian Bank. The school is spread over an area of 5 acres. It has a strength of about 600 students from five nearby villages. The school has a facility of teaching in both English and Telugu medium. The school had got a result of 88 percent in the academic year 2015–16 with a top mark of 9.3 by S.Shiva (M.Pavan Kalyan got 9.3 in 2013–14.) The school has good experienced teachers compared to other schools in the district.

Primary school 
The primary school is located beside the ZPHS school. The school has a strength of about 200 students. An English medium of study was recently introduced by the Telangana government in the year 2016.

Other schools 
The children of the village goes to other schools in the surrounding villages. They go to schools namely, Pudami The Neighborhood School, Jovial High School, St. Paul's High School, Jan Peter Memorial School, etc.

K. Krishna of Pudami school achieved a top mark of 10 points in the SSC board exams of Telangana the first and highest ever in the village.

Many movements and rallies were arranged by the school students on behalf of politics, development and awareness programs.

College 
There are no colleges in the village. The children move to the nearby town of Ibrahimpatnam for college study and many also move to Hyderabad and many other near by cities for better education facilities.

Agriculture 
The village has dry land. Almost 90 percent of the people depend on agriculture. The farmers depend on rains for cultivation as it has low ground water level. They mostly cultivate dry land crops, only some cultivate paddy. They cultivate cotton, jowar, cereals, etc.
The village has all kinds of soil but mostly has red soil. Black and alluvial soils are found in some places.

Bank 
The village has a bank named Indian Bank. People from five nearby villages open their account in the bank.

References 

Villages in Ranga Reddy district